Sandøy is a former municipality in Møre og Romsdal county, Norway. It was part of the Romsdal region. The administrative centre was the village of Steinshamn. Other villages included Ona and Myklebost. The municipality was spread out over many islands in the mouth of the vast Romsdal Fjord. The Flatflesa Lighthouse and Ona Lighthouse protect the boats traveling around the municipality. The Nordøy Fixed Link project was constructed from 2018 until 2023 and it includes three undersea tunnels and several bridges that will connect the main islands of Sandøy Municipality and the islands of Haram Municipality to the mainland.

At the time if its dissolution in 2020, the  municipality is the 416th largest by area out of the 422 municipalities in Norway. Sandøy is the 371st most populous municipality in Norway with a population of 1,263.

General information

The municipality of Sandø i Romsdal was established on 1 January 1867 when it was separated from Akerø Municipality. The initial population was 601. The spelling of the name was later changed to Sandøy. During the 1960s, there were many municipal mergers across Norway due to the work of the Schei Committee. On 1 January 1965, the Myklebost area on Harøya island and some smaller islands to the west (population: 287) were transferred from Haram Municipality to Sandøy Municipality.

On 1 January 2020, the municipality of Sandøy was dissolved. The islands of Orta and Lyngværet (and the small surrounding islands) were merged into Aukra Municipality. The remainder of the old Sandøy Municipality was merged with Haram Municipality, Ørskog Municipality, Skodje Municipality, and Ålesund Municipality to form one large municipality of Ålesund.

Name
The municipality (originally the parish) is named after the farm and the small island, Sandøya, since the first Sandøy Church was built there. The first element is sandr which means "sand" and the last element is øy which means "island". The name was historically spelled Sandø or Sandøen.

Coat of arms
The coat of arms was granted on 12 December 1986. The arms show the light beams from the Ona Lighthouse, since lighthouses play an important role in the safety in the municipality, which consists of 871 islands and skerries.

Churches
The Church of Norway had one parish within the municipality of Sandøy. It is part of the Molde domprosti (arch-deanery) in the Diocese of Møre.

Geography
Sandøy is an island municipality. Sandøy consists of 871 islands, but only five are regularly inhabited. The main inhabited islands are Harøya, Sandøya, Finnøya, Ona, and Orta. Ona is the most famous of the islands and is a popular tourist destination due to its history and the Ona Lighthouse.

Government
All municipalities in Norway, including Sandøy, are responsible for primary education (through 10th grade), outpatient health services, senior citizen services, unemployment and other social services, zoning, economic development, and municipal roads. The municipality is governed by a municipal council of elected representatives, which in turn elect a mayor.  The municipality falls under the Romsdal District Court and the Frostating Court of Appeal.

Municipal council
The municipal council of Sandøy is made up of 19 representatives that are elected to four year terms. The party breakdown for the final municipal council was as follows:

See also
List of former municipalities of Norway

References

External links

Municipal fact sheet from Statistics Norway 

 
Ålesund
Aukra
Former municipalities of Norway
1867 establishments in Norway
2020 disestablishments in Norway
Populated places disestablished in 2020